Bondebladet (Norwegian: the Farmers' Paper) is a Norwegian language weekly newspaper published in Oslo, Norway. The paper has been in circulation since 1974.

History and profile
Bondebladet was established in 1974. The paper is the official organ of the Norwegian Farmers' Union. As of 1997 its publishers were the Norwegian Farmers' Union and the Norwegian Agricultural Co-operative Society. It is published by Tun Media on a weekly basis and is based in Oslo. Its target audience is the Norwegian farmers and the paper provides them with an opportunity to publish their advertisements. The weekly is published in tabloid format and is sent to the members of the Union and to other agriculture-related institutions.

Bondebladet had a circulation of 83,000 copies in 2003. The paper claimed a circulation of 63,479 copies and the readership of 110,000 in 2014.

See also
 List of newspapers in Norway

References

External links
 Official website

1974 establishments in Norway
Newspapers published in Oslo
Norwegian-language newspapers
Publications established in 1974
Weekly newspapers published in Norway